Ed Wallace is an American radio personality. He is the founder and owner of Mogul & Mogul Productions in Fort Worth, Texas.  He is a former car salesman. He is the presenter of Wheels with Ed Wallace which broadcasts out of Dallas, Texas on radio station KLIF 570 AM. The show, which is also broadcast over the Internet, focuses mainly on automotive subjects and is sponsored by local dealerships .

Wallace also writes a weekly column in the Fort Worth Star-Telegram and is a contributing writer for BusinessWeek online.

The show has been given the Dallas Press Club's Katy Award for "Best Radio Documentary" and Wallace is a recipient of the 2001 Gerald Loeb Award for Radio from the Anderson School of Business at UCLA for outstanding business journalism.

References

External links
Ed Wallace's website
Ed Wallace's column in Ft. Worth Star Telegram (newspaper)
Ed Wallace's articles in Business Week

American columnists
American radio personalities
Car-related mass media
Radio personalities from Dallas
Year of birth missing (living people)
Living people
Gerald Loeb Award winners for Radio